The Department of Defence Production was an Australian government department that existed between May 1951 and April 1958.

Scope
Information about the department's functions and/or government funding allocation could be found in the Administrative Arrangements Orders, the annual Portfolio Budget Statements and in the Department's annual reports.

The Department was created with responsibility for the manufacture and supply of munitions (armaments, ammunition, weapons, machine tools, war chemicals, radar), aircraft production and defence production planning.

Structure
The Department was a Commonwealth Public Service department, staffed by officials who were responsible to the Minister for Defence Production.

References

Defence Production
Ministries established in 1951
1951 establishments in Australia
1958 disestablishments in Australia
Government agencies established in 1951
Government agencies disestablished in 1958